DSC may refer to:

Academia
 Doctor of Science (D.Sc.)
 District Selection Committee, an entrance exam in India
 Doctor of Surgical Chiropody, superseded in the 1960s by Doctor of Podiatric Medicine

Educational institutions 
 Dalton State College, Georgia, United States
 Daytona State College, Florida, United States
 Deep Springs College, California, United States
 Dixie State College, now Utah Tech University, Utah, United States
 Dyal Singh College, Delhi, India
 DSC International School, Hong Kong, China

Science and technology
 DECT Standard Cipher, an encryption algorithm used by wireless telephone systems
 Dice similarity coefficient, a statistical measure
 Differential scanning calorimetry, or the differential scanning calorimeter
 Digital selective calling in marine telecommunications
 Digital setting circles on telescopes
 Digital signal controller, a hybrid microcontroller and digital signal processor
 Digital still camera, a type of camera
 Display Stream Compression, a VESA-developed video compression algorithm
 Distributed source coding, in information theory and communication
 Document Structuring Conventions a PostScript standard
 Doppler shift compensation, in bat echolocation
 Dye-sensitized solar cell
 Dynamic stability control, computerized technology that improves a vehicle's stability 
 Desired State Configuration, a feature of Windows PowerShell
 Dynamic susceptibility contrast, a technique in perfusion MRI
 A subarctic climate in Köppen climate classification

Government and military
 Defence Security Corps, of the Indian Army
 Defense Security Command, of the Republic of Korea Armed Forces
 Distinguished Service Cross (Australia), an Australian military award
 Distinguished Service Cross (United Kingdom), a British naval award
 Distinguished Service Cross (United States), an American military award
 United States District Court for the District of South Carolina

Media and entertainment
 Daily Source Code, a podcast by Adam Curry
 Dallas Symphony Chorus, an American choir
 Dave, Shelly, and Chainsaw, a morning radio show in the San Diego, California area
 DeepSouthCon, a science fiction convention in the southern United States
 Dutch Swing College Band, a Dutch jazz ensemble
 Star Trek: Discovery, an American science fiction television series

Sport 
 Delbrücker SC, a German association football club from Delbrück, North Rhine-Westphalia
 Deep South Conference, a defunct NCAA athletic conference
 Dresdner SC, a German multisport club from Dresden, Saxony
 Dubai Sports City, a multi-venue sports complex in Dubai, United Arab Emirates
 U.S. Postal Service Pro Cycling Team, an American professional road bicycle racing team

Other uses 
 Directory of Social Change, a British charity
 Down Syndrome Centre, a registered charity in Ireland
 Dschang Airport, in Cameroon